Mangala Yapa is the Chairman of Board of Investment of Sri Lanka (BOI).

He was also former Managing Director of the Agency for Development of the Ministry of Development Strategies and International Trade in Sri Lanka.

Education
Mangala Yapa was born on 13 November 1957 in Badulla, Sri Lanka and after winning a scholarship attended Nalanda College, Colombo for secondary studies. After leaving Nalanda continuing his higher studies he received a Ministry of Higher Education scholarship to Astrakhan State University, Russia where he obtained a MSc in Ship Building.

Yapa, who is a Marine Engineer, Naval Architect and a Chartered Engineer by profession, is a Fellow of Institution of Engineers, Sri Lanka, Member of Institute of Marine Engineering, Science and Technology (IMarEST-UK). He is also obtained a Master of Business Administration from University of Sri Jayewardenepura.

Career
During Yapa's professional career he had been the Chief Executive Officer and Managing Director of Colombo Dockyard. CEO and Secretary General of the Ceylon Chamber of Commerce.

Awards
In 2013 Yapa was presented with 'Excellence in Engineering' award by the Institution of Engineers Sri Lanka for his outstanding achievements in the Marine engineering category for transforming the Colombo Dockyard in to a world class shipbuilder and repairer.

References

 Amb Carmon Meets Sri Lankan PM Ranil Wickramasinge
 Sri Lanka, Philippines Identify 'thrust sectors' for joint collaboration
 CCC appoints Mangala Yapa as Secretary General/CEO
 Colombo Dockyard, Mangala Yapa - Managing Director/CEO
 IESL College of Engineering 'Open Day' today
 Mr. Mangala Yapa elected as the President of National Chamber of Exporters
 U.S. Patenting
 Mobitel main sponsor for 22nd Annual National Chamber of Exporters Awards
 National Conference on Green Practices, at Waters Edge tomorrow
 One stop-shop Central Steering Committee takes charge of investment projects

Sinhalese businesspeople
Sri Lankan Buddhists
Alumni of Nalanda College, Colombo
Sinhalese engineers
1957 births
Living people